Marco Antonio Canchila Vasquez (born January 6, 1981) is a Colombian retired footballer who played as a midfielder.

References

1981 births
Living people
Association football midfielders
Colombian footballers
Colombian expatriate footballers
Real Cartagena footballers
Footballers from Bogotá
Club Almirante Brown footballers
América de Cali footballers
Once Caldas footballers
La Equidad footballers
Atlético Huila footballers
Fortaleza C.E.I.F. footballers
Unión Magdalena footballers
Categoría Primera A players
Categoría Primera B players
Colombian expatriate sportspeople in Argentina
Expatriate footballers in Argentina